Monument to Nizami Ganjavi in Baku
 Monument to Nizami Ganjavi in Ganja
 Monument to Nizami Ganjavi in Beijing
 Monument to Nizami Ganjavi in Chișinău
 Monument to Nizami Ganjavi in Rome
 Monument to Nizami Ganjavi in Saint Petersburg
 Monument to Nizami Ganjavi in Tashkent